The Escoe Building (also known as the Simmons Building) was a historic commercial building located at 228-230 North Second Street in Muskogee, Oklahoma.

Description and history 
It was a two-story brick office building built in 1908 and demolished in 1988.

The Escoe Building was the only professional building in Muskogee's black district and housed the first black-owned bank in Oklahoma. It was also known as the Simmons Building because it housed the Simmons Royalty Co., Oklahoma's first major oil business owned by a black family.

It was listed on the National Register of Historic Places on July 14, 1983.

References

1908 establishments in Oklahoma
1988 disestablishments in Oklahoma
African-American history of Oklahoma
Buildings and structures demolished in 1988
Buildings and structures in Muskogee, Oklahoma
Commercial buildings on the National Register of Historic Places in Oklahoma
National Register of Historic Places in Muskogee County, Oklahoma
Office buildings completed in 1908